Cerynia or Kerynia may refer to:
Keryneia, in Cyprus
Ceryneia, in Greece
Cerynia (planthopper), a genus of insects in the family Flatidae